The St. Francis of Assisi Church or the Proto-Cathedral of St. Francis of Assisi, or simply Church of St. Francis, is a religious building that is affiliated with the Catholic Church and is located in the city of Aden, in the Asian country of Yemen.

The temple served as the cathedral of the Apostolic Vicariate of Southern Arabia (or Vicariate Apostolic of Aden) between 1892 and 1974, being from that year the new headquarters of the Vicariate of St. Joseph's Cathedral in Abu Dhabi in the United Arab Emirates. Currently only it has the status of parish church. Its structure remains but has deteriorated considerably.

The statue of Christ blessing the sea has been attacked several times but remains in place. When the British ruled the region, next to the church it worked a School only for boys (School of St. Anthony) but then the Yemeni government appropriated the school and built a wall between the temple and school.

See also
Catholic Church in Yemen
St. Francis of Assisi Church (disambiguation)

References

Roman Catholic cathedrals in Yemen
Buildings and structures in Aden
Apostolic Vicariate of Southern Arabia
Catholic Church in the Arabian Peninsula